Ronald Louis Akers (born January 7, 1939 in New Albany, Indiana) is an American criminologist and professor emeritus of criminology and law at the University of Florida's College of Liberal Arts and Sciences.

Career
Akers taught sociology at the University of Washington from 1965–72, criminology at Florida State University from 1972–4, and sociology at the University of Iowa from 1974–80. He chaired the department of sociology at the University of Iowa from 1978 to 1980, when he became a professor at the University of Florida. From 1980 to 1985, he chaired the department of sociology at the University of Florida, and in 1994, he became the director of the Center for Studies in Criminology and Law there.

Awards and positions
In 1979, Akers served as president of the American Society of Criminology, and he received its Edwin H. Sutherland Award in 1988.

References

External links
Faculty page

1939 births
Living people
American criminologists
Presidents of the American Society of Criminology
People from New Albany, Indiana
University of Florida faculty
Indiana State University alumni
Kent State University alumni
University of Kentucky alumni
University of Washington faculty
Florida State University faculty
University of Iowa faculty